Sardarabad (also Romanized as Sardārābād and Sardarābād; also known as Sarvarābād) is a village in Khosrow Beyk Rural District, Milajerd District, Komijan County, Markazi Province, Iran. At the 2006 census, its population was 27, in 9 families.

References 

Populated places in Komijan County